David Earl Ponder (born June 27, 1962) is a former American football defensive tackle in the National Football League for the Dallas Cowboys. He played college football at Florida State University.

Early years
Ponder attended Cairo High School in Cairo, Georgia. He received All-state honors as a senior. He accepted a football scholarship from Florida State University where he was a two-year starter at nose guard  and defensive tackle for the Seminoles. 

As a junior in 1982, he was moved from defensive tackle to nose guard to replace an injured Lennie Chavers. As a senior in 1983, he was moved back to defensive tackle and registered 5 sacks (second on the team).

Professional career

Dallas Cowboys
Ponder was signed as an undrafted free agent by the Dallas Cowboys after the 1984 NFL Draft. He played defensive tackle and was waived on August 27, 1984.

In 1985, Ponder was re-signed and appeared in four games. On October 26, he was released to make room to activate defensive tackle Don Smerek.

Los Angeles Raiders
On November 21, 1985, he was signed by the Los Angeles Raiders. He was released two days later on November 23.

Buffalo Bills
On May 6, 1986, he signed as a free agent with the Buffalo Bills to play nose guard. He was cut on August 17.

Calgary Stampeders
In 1986, he signed with the Calgary Stampeders of the Canadian Football League. He was released on October 19.

Personal life
His son Christian played quarterback for the Florida State Seminoles while in college and the Minnesota Vikings in the National Football League.

References

1962 births
Players of American football from Florida
American football defensive tackles
Canadian football defensive linemen
American players of Canadian football
Living people
Florida State Seminoles football players
Dallas Cowboys players
Los Angeles Raiders players
Calgary Stampeders players
People from Washington, North Carolina